A String Cheese Incident is the second release and first live album of Colorado-based Jam band, The String Cheese Incident. The album chronicles a single concert from the Fox Theatre in Boulder, Colorado on February 27, 1997 and is the first to feature pianist Kyle Hollingsworth as part of the group. This album is widely considered the best CD for new converts to listen to in order to become acquainted to the band's live sound.

Track listing
"Lonesome Fiddle Blues"  (Millie Clements) – 9:58 
"Little Hands"  (Bill Nershi) – 8:16 
"Dudley's Kitchen"  (Bill Nershi) – 3:02 
"Rhythm of the Road"  (Bill Nershi) – 6:08 
"How Mountain Girls Can Love"  (Stanley Brothers) – 2:56 
"Pirates" (Michael Kang) – 9:27 
"Wake Up"  (Bill Nershi) – 7:05 
"Land's End"  (Tim O'Brien) – 12:00 
"San Jose"  (Michael Kang, Bill Nershi) – 8:53 
"Walk This Way" (Joe Perry, Steven Tyler) – 4:46

Credits

The String Cheese Incident
Bill Nershi – Acoustic guitar
Keith Moseley – Bass guitar
Kyle Hollingsworth – Accordion, keyboards
Michael Kang– Mandolin, Violin
Michael Travis – drums

Production

Kevin Clock – Mixing Engineer, Mastering
Steve McNamara – Mastering
The String Cheese Incident – Producer
Jay Sayler – Recording Engineer
Austin Shaw – Cover Design, Cover Art
Jon OLeary – Co-mixing Engineer, Producer

References

The String Cheese Incident albums
1997 live albums